The Russian Academy of Architecture and Construction Sciences (RAACS or, transliterating the Russian acronym, RAASN) (РААСН) is an official academy of the Russian Federation specializing in architecture and construction, notably of urban buildings.

It was established by a decree of the President of the Russian Federation on March 26, 1992; its precursors were the Academy of Architecture of the USSR (1934–1956) and the Academy of Construction and Architecture of the USSR (1956–1964). It has 60 full members (academics), 115 corresponding members, 64 honorary members, and 75 foreign members from 25 countries. The Academy is headquartered in Moscow and it has five regional divisions: Saint Petersburg, Volga, Uralian, Siberian, and Southern.

Since 1998, the president has been Aleksandr Kudryavtsev.

References

External links 
 Official site
 Scientific Research Institute of Theory and History of Architecture and Urban Planning of the "Russian Academy of Architecture and Construction Sciences" (section)
Architecture Heritage Journal website of the Russian Academy of Architecture and Construction Sciences

 
1992 establishments in Russia
Russian culture
A
Architecture and Construction Sciences